Alexander Dawson may refer to:

 Alexander Dawson (MP) (c 1771–1831), MP for County Louth 1826–1831
 Alexander Dawson (architect), New South Wales Government Architect 1856–1862
 Alexander Dawson School (disambiguation)
  Alexander Dawson School, private school located in Lafayette, Colorado
 The Alexander Dawson School at Rainbow Mountain, independent, day school in Summerlin, Nevada